The Pach Brothers photography studio was one of the oldest photographic firms in business in New York City, having begun operations in 1867.

History
It was founded by the German-born brothers Gustavus Pach (1848-1904), Gotthelf Pach (1852-1925) and Morris Pach (1837–1914). Patrons included famous and ordinary Americans involved in business, politics, government, medicine, law, education, and the arts, as well as thousands of students, families and children who sat for Pach cameras from 1866 onward.

There was a fire in 1895, which destroyed their New York studio and processing rooms as well as their entire negative archive.

The Pach Brothers firm continued photographing for another hundred years until their dissolution in 1994.

See also
Walter Pach

References

External links

 Guide to the Pach Brothers Portrait Photograph Collection: 1867-1947, undated (bulk 1880s-1940s)
 The Pach Brothers Portrait Photograph Collection at the New York Historical Society

Photographic studios
1867 establishments in New York (state)
Photography companies of the United States
American companies established in 1867
Mass media companies established in the 1860s